Jouko Kataja (4 June 1953 – 2018) was a Finnish footballer. He played 11 eleven seasons in the Finnish premier division Mestaruussarja in 1972–1982 for Reipas, MiPK and KTP.

Kataja was a member of the Finland squad at the 1980 Summer Olympics, although he was never capped by the Finland A team.

Kataja died in November 2018 at the age of 65.

Club honours 
Finnish Cup 1973, 1980

References

1953 births
2018 deaths
Sportspeople from Lahti
Finnish footballers
Association football goalkeepers
Kotkan Työväen Palloilijat players
Sudet players
Mestaruussarja players
Olympic footballers of Finland
Footballers at the 1980 Summer Olympics
Reipas Lahti players